Jona Marie Soquite (born April 13, 2003) is a Filipino singer who won the first season of The Voice Teens.

Personal life
Soquite was born and raised in Davao City.

Career

The Voice Teens (2017) 
Soquite competed in the first season of The Voice Teens. In her Blind Audition, she auditioned with the song "Anak ng Pasig" by Smokey Mountain, turning all four chairs with Soquite choosing Sarah Geronimo as her coach. In the Battle Round, she was paired with Chloe Redondo with the song "Sana'y Maghintay ng Walang Hanggan" being assigned to the duo. She won her battle, advancing her to the Knockouts where she won singing "Stand Up For Love" by Destiny's Child. 

In Week 1 of the Live Shows, she sang "Symphony" by Clean Bandit, losing the Public Vote but being selected by her coach to advance to the next round. The following week, she sang "The Greatest Love of All", wherein she garnered enough points to earn a spot in the finale.

In the finale, she was proclaimed as the winner of the season after receiving the most votes to win.

Anak ng Pasig
Sana'y Maghintay ng Walang Hanggan
Stand Up for Love
Symphony
The Greatest Love of All
Better Days
"Just Dance"
I Believe I Can Fly

References 

2004 births
Living people
21st-century Filipino singers
Filipino child singers
The Voice (franchise) winners
Singers from Davao del Sur
People from Davao City
21st-century Filipino women singers
The Voice Teens (Philippine TV series) contestants